Crown of Horn is an album by Martin Carthy, released in 1976. It was re-issued by Topic Records on CD in 1995.

The album is remarkable for featuring intricate Moog synthesizer arrangements by Tony Cox on three songs. Tony Cox had previously made a name for himself as a producer and session musician for several progressive rock and folk rock bands, such as Caravan, Camel, Yes and Trees. In 1974 Tony Cox founded the Old Sawmill Studio in which not only Crown of Horn, but also producer Ashley Hutchings' folk dance record "Kickin' Up The Sawdust" and parts of Fairport Convention's Gottle O'Geer album were produced in 1976.

Track listing
All songs are Traditional unless noted otherwise and were arranged by Martin Carthy.

The references after the titles below are from the three major numbering schemes for traditional folk songs, the Roud Folk Song Index, Child Ballad Numbers and the Laws Numbers.

 "The Bedmaking" (Roud 1631) – 3:16
 "Locks and Bolts" (Roud 406; Laws M13) – 3:17
 "King Knapperty" (Roud 32; Child 33) – 3:36
 "Geordie" (Roud 90; Child 209) – 3:42
 "Willie's Lady" (Roud 220; Child 6) – 7:23
 "Virginny" – 2:19
 "The Worcestershire Wedding" (Roud 1694) – 3:12
 "Bonny Lass of Anglesey" (Roud 3931; Child 220) – 5:41
 "William Taylor The Poacher" (Roud 851)  – 3:12
 "Old Tom of Oxford" (instrumental) – 1:47
 "Palaces of Gold" (Leon Rosselson) – 4:59

Personnel
Martin Carthy – vocals, acoustic guitar
Tony Cox – Moog synthesizer (5,8,11)
Technical
Ashley Hutchings – production
Jerry Boys - engineer
Keith Morris - cover photography

References

External links
https://mainlynorfolk.info/martin.carthy/records/crownofhorn.html

1976 albums
Martin Carthy albums
Topic Records albums